Joshua Caleb Gordon (born April 13, 1991) is an American football wide receiver for the Seattle Sea Dragons of the XFL. Nicknamed "Flash", he previously played in the National Football League (NFL) for 11 seasons. Gordon played college football at Baylor University and was selected by the Cleveland Browns in the second round of the 2012 NFL Supplemental Draft. Throughout his career, Gordon has been lauded for his on-field production, but has also faced several suspensions for violating the NFL's substance abuse policy.

Gordon had a breakout season in 2013 by leading the league in receiving yards, which earned him Pro Bowl and first-team All-Pro honors. Over the next four years, however, Gordon only played 11 games for the Browns due to his substance abuse suspensions and missed the entirety of the 2015 and 2016 seasons. He was traded to the New England Patriots in 2018, but voluntarily left the active roster amid a potential indefinite suspension from the NFL. Gordon returned the following season with the Patriots and Seattle Seahawks before further substance abuse violations led to his suspension in 2020. Reinstated the next year, he spent one season each with the Kansas City Chiefs and Tennessee Titans. Gordon joined the Sea Dragons in 2022.

Early years
Gordon was born to Elaine and Herald Gordon in Houston, Texas, on April 13, 1991, and he has two brothers. Gordon is of Haitian descent.

Gordon attended Lamar High School in Houston, where he played football, basketball, and ran track. He played basketball as a sophomore. In football, he caught 20 passes for 363 yards and four touchdowns as a junior. As a senior, he was named first-team All-District 20-5A after totaling 25 receptions for 531 yards (21.2 average) and nine touchdowns.

He also competed in track & field as a senior, where he ran a leg on the Lamar 4 × 100m and 4 × 200m relay squads, helping them capture the state title in both events with times of 42.69 seconds and 1:30.43 minutes, respectively.

During the college recruitment period, Gordon was targeted by Baylor, Houston, Kansas, Missouri, Nebraska, and Texas Tech. According to Rivals.com, Gordon was ranked as a 3-star wide receiver, while Scout.com rated him as a 2-star at the position.

College career
Gordon accepted an athletic scholarship to play football for Baylor University. Although he received multiple Division I offers, his choice of Baylor was easy due to his supervised probation which required him to not leave the state of Texas.  However, in October 2010, during his sophomore year, he and teammate Willie Jefferson were found asleep in a local Taco Bell drive-through lane. Police found marijuana in Jefferson's car. Jefferson, who was driving, was kicked off the team due to it being his second violation, but Gordon was only suspended.

In July 2011, Gordon was suspended indefinitely by head coach Art Briles for later failing a drug test and testing positive for marijuana.

In August 2011, Gordon transferred to the University of Utah, but did not play during the 2011 season after declaring too late for the 2011 Supplemental Draft.

Statistics

Professional career

Cleveland Browns

2012 season
Gordon was taken in the second round of the 2012 Supplemental Draft by the Cleveland Browns. On July 16, 2012, Gordon signed a four-year, $5.3 million deal with the Browns.

Gordon finished among the top rookie wide receivers in the 2012 draft class. He recorded 50 catches, 805 yards, and five touchdowns in the 2012 season. Gordon scored his first NFL touchdown against the New York Giants in Week 5, where he finished with two catches for 82 yards and two touchdowns. Gordon had his first 100-yard game against the Oakland Raiders in Week 13, where he finished with six catches for 116 yards and a touchdown. Gordon had a then career-high of eight catches against the Kansas City Chiefs in Week 14. He finished his rookie season with 50 receptions for 805 receiving yards and five receiving touchdowns.

2013 season
On June 7, 2013, the NFL announced that Gordon would be suspended for the first two games of the 2013 season due to violating the NFL's substance-abuse policy. He returned from his suspension and had ten receptions for 146 yards and a touchdown in the 31–27 victory over the Minnesota Vikings. In Week 8, against the Kansas City Chiefs, he had five receptions for 132 receiving yards and a touchdown. In Week 11, against the Cincinnati Bengals, he had five receptions for 125 yards and a touchdown. In Week 12, against the Pittsburgh Steelers, Gordon had 237 receiving yards, and 261 the following week against the Jacksonville Jaguars, the first time in NFL history that a wide receiver had back-to-back regular season games with at least 200 receiving yards. The following game, he had seven receptions for 151 yards and a touchdown against the New England Patriots. Gordon's stretch of 774 receiving yards set an NFL record for most in a four-game stretch. On December 26, 2013, he was named the Cleveland Chapter PFWA Player of the Year following the season. The next day, Gordon was voted to his first Pro Bowl. He finished the 2013 season with 87 receptions, nine receiving touchdowns, and a league-leading 1,646 receiving yards in 14 games. He was ranked 16th by his fellow players on the NFL Top 100 Players of 2014. He earned First Team All-Pro honors.

2014 season

On July 5, 2014, Gordon was arrested for driving while impaired in Raleigh, North Carolina.

On August 27, 2014, Gordon acknowledged that the NFL suspended him for one year for violating the league's substance-abuse policy. On September 19, 2014, his suspension was reduced to 10 games amidst the new NFL drug policy. Gordon was officially reinstated on November 17.

On December 27, 2014, exactly one year removed from being selected into the Pro Bowl, the Browns suspended Gordon from the final game of the season due to a violation of team rules.

Due to Gordon's suspensions, he only played five games in the 2014 season and caught 24 passes for 303 yards.

2015 season
Gordon was suspended for the entire 2015 season due to violating the league's substance abuse policy. Gordon entered the NFL's substance abuse program after pleading guilty to a driving while impaired charge in September 2014 and was prohibited from consuming alcohol during his time in the program. The suspension was for one year starting on February 3, 2015, and he was not eligible to return until the start of the 2016 season.

2016 season

On January 20, 2016, Gordon applied to the league for reinstatement. His request was denied in March when it was reported that he had failed another drug test.

On July 25, 2016, Gordon was reinstated by the NFL. He was allowed to participate in training camp but was suspended for the first four games of the 2016 regular season.

On September 29, 2016, Gordon left the Browns to enter an in-patient rehabilitation facility. He was one week away from reinstatement to the NFL, serving his previous sentence of four regular-season games. In a press statement, Gordon wrote, "After careful thought and deep consideration I've decided that I need to step away from pursuing my return to the Browns and my football career to enter an in-patient rehabilitation facility. This is the right decision for me and one that I hope will enable me to gain full control of my life and continue on a path to reach my full potential as a person. I appreciate the support of the NFL, NFLPA, the Browns, my teammates, my agent and the community through this extremely challenging process."

2017 season
On March 1, 2017, Gordon again applied to the league for reinstatement, but was denied on May 11, 2017. On November 1, Gordon was finally reinstated, but on a conditional basis, meaning that he would be eligible to return in Week 13. He was officially activated off the Commissioner's Exempt list on November 30, 2017, for the Browns' Week 13 game against the Los Angeles Chargers. He finished the game with 85 receiving yards in a 19–10 Browns loss. On December 10, 2017, while playing the Green Bay Packers, Gordon scored his first touchdown since the 2013 season.

2018 season
Gordon played in only one game for the Browns in 2018. During Week 1 against the Pittsburgh Steelers, he made a late-game reception for a 17-yard touchdown resulting in a 21–21 tie following overtime. The following week the Browns indicated that they would be parting ways with Gordon after he "violated the team's trust". Initially, it was reported that the Browns finally lost patience with him after he injured his hamstring during an off-field event on September 12. The Browns had been led to believe he was shooting a promotional video for his clothing line and didn't know he was running 40s. However, it was later reported that there were multiple factors in the decision to part ways with the troubled receiver. Reportedly, the Browns were angered when he reported to practice 10 minutes late on September 13 and was "not himself." According to The Plain Dealer, the Browns feared that he was struggling to stay sober, and had done everything they believed they could do to keep him on the right path.

New England Patriots

2018 season
On September 17, 2018, Gordon was traded along with a seventh-round draft pick in the 2019 NFL Draft to the New England Patriots in exchange for a 2019 fifth-round draft pick. In his first game with the Patriots, Gordon caught two passes for 32 yards in a 38–7 victory over the Miami Dolphins. In the next game against the Indianapolis Colts, Gordon caught Tom Brady's 500th NFL touchdown pass. It was also Gordon's first touchdown as a Patriot. In the next game against the Kansas City Chiefs, he recorded five receptions for 42 yards as the Patriots narrowly won 43–40. During Week 7, the Patriots went on the road to face the Chicago Bears. In the 38–31 victory, Gordon recorded four receptions and 100 yards to record his first 100-yard game as a Patriot. Later in the game, he took on defensive back duties to defend against Bears' quarterback Mitchell Trubisky's Hail Mary pass. While he was unable to prevent the reception by receiver Kevin White, White was stopped one yard short of the goal line, sealing the New England win. On November 4, Gordon recorded five receptions for 130 yards and a 55-yard touchdown against the Green Bay Packers.

On December 20, Gordon announced that he would step away from football to focus on his mental health. The NFL later stated that Gordon would be facing an indefinite ban for violating the terms of his conditional reinstatement under the NFL drug policy. Gordon finished his first season with the Patriots with 40 receptions for 720 yards and three touchdowns.

Without Gordon, the Patriots reached Super Bowl LIII where they beat the Los Angeles Rams, 13–3. Although he did not play in the game because of his suspension, Gordon still received a ring for his earlier contributions to the team.

2019 season

On March 12, 2019, the Patriots placed a second-round tender on Gordon, securing his services for the upcoming 2019 season, should he be reinstated by the NFL. Gordon took to Instagram shortly after to thank the team, and reaffirm his commitment to getting back on the field. Two weeks later, during a press conference at the Governors’ meeting in Arizona, NFL Commissioner Roger Goodell was asked about Gordon's status, and said that "the NFL was focused on getting him on the right track, and hopefully back on the field soon". Ultimately, on August 16, 2019, the NFL conditionally reinstated Gordon, thus granting him the opportunity to play Week 1. During Week 1 against the Pittsburgh Steelers, in his first game since Week 13 of the 2018 season, Gordon had three receptions for 73 yards and one touchdown in a 33–3 win. On October 23, 2019, the Patriots placed Gordon on injured reserve with a knee injury. He was waived from injured reserve on October 31, 2019.

Seattle Seahawks
On November 1, 2019, Gordon was claimed off waivers by the Seattle Seahawks. In Week 15 against the Carolina Panthers, Gordon caught one pass for 58 yards and threw a pass that was intercepted by safety Tre Boston during the 30–24 win. On December 16, 2019, Gordon was suspended indefinitely for violating the NFL's policy on performance-enhancing drugs and substance abuse, his fifth suspension for violating the policy.

After becoming a free agent in March 2020, he re-signed with the Seahawks on September 3, 2020. He was conditionally reinstated from suspension on December 3, and the NFL announced he could be eligible to play in the last two weeks of the regular season. On December 21, 2020, Gordon was added to the Seahawks active roster after the NFL ruled him eligible to return from his suspension. One day later, the NFL determined that Gordon had broken the terms of his conditional reinstatement, and the Seahawks were again given a roster exemption for him. His conditional reinstatement was rescinded, and he was suspended indefinitely by the NFL again on January 15, 2021. He was released by the Seahawks on March 4, 2021.

FCF Zappers
On February 27, 2021, Gordon signed with the FCF Zappers of the Fan Controlled Football League while being suspended from the NFL. In his first game, Gordon had four catches for 70 yards and the walk off Hail Mary helping the Zappers move to 2-2.

He played two games for the Zappers while catching seven passes for 100 yards and three touchdowns.

Kansas City Chiefs
Gordon applied for reinstatement from NFL suspension in July 2021 and was reinstated in September 2021. After being reinstated from suspension, Gordon signed with the Kansas City Chiefs' practice squad on September 28, 2021. He was signed to the active roster on October 5, 2021. In the Chiefs week 14 game against the Las Vegas Raiders, he caught a 1-yard touchdown. It was his first touchdown since 2019. On December 13, he tested positive for COVID-19 and was placed on the Reserve/COVID-19 list. He was reactivated on December 22.

The Chiefs chose to make Gordon a healthy inactive for the Wild Card Round game against the Pittsburgh Steelers. He was waived by the Chiefs on January 24, 2022, and re-signed to the practice squad. He signed a reserve/future contract with the Chiefs on February 2, 2022.

Gordon was waived by the team on August 30, 2022.

Tennessee Titans
On September 1, 2022, Gordon was signed to the Tennessee Titans' practice squad.

On September 19, 2022, Gordon made his Titans' debut against the Buffalo Bills on Monday Night Football.  He was released on October 17, 2022.

Seattle Sea Dragons
The Seattle Sea Dragons selected Gordon in the sixth round of the 2023 XFL Supplemental Draft on January 1, 2023. In Week 1 against the D.C. Defenders, Gordon had 6 receptions for 74 yards and a touchdown in the 22–18 loss. In Week 3 against the Vegas Vipers, Gordon caught a 65-yard touchdown from Ben DiNucci with 58 seconds left in the game to win 30–26.

Career statistics

NFL

Arena Football

Spring Football

Records and achievements

NFL records
 Most consecutive games, 200+ yards receiving: 2 (November 24, 2013, 237 yards; December 1, 2013, 261 yards)

Browns franchise records
 Most receptions, game: 14 on (November 24, 2013, against the Pittsburgh Steelers; tied with Ozzie Newsome, 1984)
 Most receiving yards, game: 261 yards (December 1, 2013, against the Jacksonville Jaguars)
 Most receiving yards, season: 1,646 yards (2013)
 Most receiving yards per game, season: 117.6 (2013)
 100+ receiving yard games, season: 7 (2013)

References

External links

Baylor Bears bio

1991 births
Living people
Lamar High School (Houston, Texas) alumni
American football wide receivers
American sportspeople of Haitian descent
Baylor Bears football players
Cleveland Browns players
New England Patriots players
Players of American football from Houston
Unconferenced Pro Bowl players
Seattle Seahawks players
Fan Controlled Football players
Kansas City Chiefs players
Tennessee Titans players
Seattle Sea Dragons players